Glee: The Music, Volume 4 is the fifth soundtrack album by the cast of the musical television series Glee, which airs on Fox in the United States. It was released on November 26, 2010, by Columbia Records and features cover version performances from the first half of the second season. Executive production was handled by Dante Di Loreto and Brad Falchuk and all tracks were released as singles. It was nominated for a Grammy Award (2011) in the Best Compilation Soundtrack for Visual Media category.

Background
The album's tracks constitute performances from eight of the first nine episodes of the season; the fifth, "The Rocky Horror Glee Show", received its own extended play in October 2010, Glee: The Music, The Rocky Horror Glee Show. The track listing for Glee: The Music, Volume 4 was revealed on November 3, 2010, followed by the official press release on November 9, 2010. The album was preceded by Glee: The Music, The Christmas Album on November 16, 2010, which accompanies a later Christmas episode. Actress Gwyneth Paltrow guest-starred on an episode performing "Forget You", the censored version of Cee Lo Green's 2010 single "Fuck You", which appears on the album.

Reception

The series' cover versions received mixed reviews throughout the season. MTV News felt "Empire State of Mind" lacked gravitas and The Washington Post thought it was "maybe-trying-too-hard". The latter, however, also deemed "Billionaire" the best performance of the episode. Kevin McHale's version of Britney Spears' "Stronger" and Lea Michele's version of Paramore's "The Only Exception" were praised by critics, with Entertainment Weekly complimenting the soulful cover of the former and Rolling Stone calling the latter "gorgeous and tender". On "Me Against the Music", Naya Rivera's vocals were met positively while Heather Morris was described as "not a standout vocalist". The interpretation of "I Want to Hold Your Hand" received mixed criticism, from the Daily News receiving Chris Colfer's vocal performance and the context of its lyrics negatively to The A.V. Club calling it "one of his best performances on the show". Both The Wall Street Journal and Zap2it praised the vocals on the duets "River Deep, Mountain High" and "Lucky". The vocal arrangement of "Marry You" was well-enjoyed by Rolling Stone, but the next track "Sway" was deemed inferior to the Michael Bublé cover.

Alicia Keys and Travie McCoy were two of many artists covered who approved of their respective songs; the former called "Empire State of Mind" "amazing". The social networking site Twitter was frequently used for this—Spears was impressed with the covers of "Stronger" and "Toxic" and Paramore's Hayley Williams complimented Michele's vocals on "The Only Exception". Additionally, Katy Perry used the site to praise the a cappella rendition of "Teenage Dream", which features guest star Darren Criss as lead vocalist. Speaking to MTV News, Green expressed flattery that Paltrow was covering his song.

Chart performance
Glee: The Music, Volume 4 debuted at number five on the Billboard 200 and number two on the Billboard Soundtracks chart with sales 128,000 in the US. It debuted the same week on the Canadian Albums Chart at number six. On the Australian Singles Chart, the album made its debut on December 6, 2010, at number three and has been certified gold for 35,000 units. In New Zealand, Volume 4 debuted at number ten.

Singles
All tracks have been released as singles, available for digital download throughout the season's airings from September through November 2010. All singles except "Sway" have charted on both the Billboard Hot 100 and the Canadian Hot 100; the highest-charting of these was the cover of "Teenage Dream" at number eight and ten, respectively. The single sold 55,000 copies in its first day, and went on to beat the first-week sales record of 177,000 previously held by debut single "Don't Stop Believin', with 214,000 in the US. In Canada, 13,000 copies were sold. The chart performance of "Teenage Dream" surpassed that of "Toxic", which peaked at number sixteen in the US and fifteen in Canada. It sold 109,000 copies in the US and, at the time, was the cast's second-highest-charting entry on the Billboard Hot 100, tied with "Total Eclipse of the Heart". In other countries, the best-performing singles were "Billionaire" at number fifteen in Ireland, and "Empire State of Mind" at number twenty in Australia. "Empire State of Mind" marked the highest first-day sales of any Glee song at the time with 106,000 downloads in the US over the week following its release.

The record for most appearances by a group on the Billboard Hot 100, previously set by The Beatles, was broken when six songs debuted on the chart the week of October 16, 2010. This feat also placed the cast third overall among all artists, behind James Brown and Elvis Presley. Four songs debuted on November 18, 2010, which pushed the number of appearances to ninety-three, surpassing Brown's accomplishment to land at second.

Track listing
Information is based on the album's Liner notes

Personnel
Information is taken from Liner notes

Dianna Agron - lead vocals (8, 10, 14, 18)
Adam Anders - record producer, recording engineer, music & vocal arranger, additional background vocals (1-11, 13–18)
Alex Anders - recording engineer (1-11, 13–18)
Nikki Anders - additional background vocals (1-11, 13–18)
Peer Astrom - music arranger, record producer, recording engineer, audio mixing (1-11, 13–18)
Kala Balch – additional background vocals (1-11, 13–18)
Colin Benward – additional background vocals (1-11, 13–18)
Dave Bett – art direction
PJ Bloom – music supervisor
Ed Boyer – music arranger, vocal arranger, additional recording engineer (12)
Ravaughn Brown – additional background vocals (1-11, 13–18)
Geoff Bywater – executive in charge of music
Sam Cantor – background vocals (12)
Josh Cheuse – art direction
Deyder Cintron – assistant recording engineer, digital editing (1-11, 13–18)
Chris Colfer – lead vocals (7-8)
Kamari Copeland – additional background vocals (1-11, 13–18)
Darren Criss – lead vocals (12)
Tim Davis – additional vocal arrangement, vocal contractor, additional background vocals (1-11, 13–18)
Dante Di Loreto – soundtrack executive producer
Brad Falchuk – soundtrack executive producer
Tommy Faragher – record producer (12)
Conor Flynn – background vocals (12)
Michael Grant – background vocals (12)
Heather Guibert – coordination
Missi Hale – additional background vocals (1-11, 13–18)
Jon Hall – additional background vocals (1-11, 13–18)
Samantha Jade – additional background vocals (1-11, 13–18)
Tobias Kampe-Flygare – assistant recording engineer (1-11, 13–18)
Charlie Kramsky – assistant recording engineer (12)
John Kwon – background vocals (12)

Storm Lee – additional background vocals (1-11, 13–18)
David Loucks – additional background vocals (1-11, 13–18)
Meaghan Lyons – coordination
Cailin Mackenzie – background vocals (12)
Dominick Maita – mastering
Kent McCann – background vocals (12)
Kevin McHale – lead vocals (1-2, 4, 11, 13–14)
Lea Michele – lead vocals (5-6, 8, 14)
Cory Monteith – lead vocals (1-2, 4, 8, 14, 16)
Heather Morris – lead vocals (3, 5, 14)
Matthew Morrison – lead vocals (5, 15)
Eric Morrissey – background vocals (12)
Ryan Murphy – record producer (1-11, 13–18), soundtrack producer
Jeanette Olsson – additional background vocals (1-11, 13–18)
Chord Overstreet – lead vocals (2, 10, 14, 18)
Gwyneth Paltrow - lead vocals (13)
Martin Persson – additional music arranger, orchestration, music programming (1-11, 13–18)
Stefan Persson – additional horn arranger (1-11, 13–18)
Zac Poor – additional background vocals (1-11, 13–18)
Evan Powell – background vocals (12)
Nicole Ray – production coordination
Amber Riley – lead vocals (1, 8–9, 13)
Naya Rivera – lead vocals (1, 3, 9, 17)
Penn Rosen – background vocals (12)
Mark Salling – lead vocals (1-2, 4, 11)
Drew Ryan Scott – additional background vocals (1-11, 13–18)
Eli Seidman – background vocals (12)
Onitsha Shaw – additional background vocals (1-11, 13–18)
Harry Shum Jr. - lead vocals (14)
Jenny Sinclair – coordination
Bryan Smith – recording engineer, audio mixing (12)
Robert Smith – recording engineer (12)
Sally Stevens – additional music arranger, additional vocal arranger, vocal contractor (12)
Jack Thomas – background vocals (12)
Kerstin Thörn – additional string arranger (1-11, 13–18)
Jenna Ushkowitz – lead vocals (8, 14)
Windy Wagner – additional background vocals (1-11, 13–18)

Charts

Weekly charts

Year-end charts

Certifications

Release history

References

External links
Glee: The Music, Volume 4 at GleeTheMusic.com
[ Glee: The Music, Volume 4] at allmusic

2010 soundtrack albums
Columbia Records soundtracks
Glee (TV series) albums